is a monorail station on the Chiba Urban Monorail located in Inage-ku in the city of Chiba, Chiba Prefecture, Japan. It is located 4.0 kilometers from the northern terminus of the line at Chiba Station.

It contains two baseball fields, tennis courts and a full running track.

Lines
 Chiba Urban Monorail Line 2

Layout
Sports Center Station is an elevated station with two opposed side platforms serving two tracks.

Platforms

History
Sports Center Station was opened on March 28, 1988.

See also
 List of railway stations in Japan

External links

Chiba Urban Monorail website 

Railway stations in Japan opened in 1988
Railway stations in Chiba Prefecture